U.S. Route 11 (US 11) roughly parallels Interstate 81 (I-81) in the U.S. state of Pennsylvania. The route runs from the Maryland state line in Antrim Township, Franklin County, northeast to the New York state line in Great Bend Township, Susquehanna County. US 11 serves Harrisburg, Wilkes-Barre, and Scranton. Between Harrisburg and Scranton, US 11 follows the Susquehanna River, while I-81 follows a shorter route over the mountains further to the east.

Route description
US 11 enters Pennsylvania parallel to I-81 south of Greencastle in Antrim Township, Franklin County.  The two routes head to the northeast, running parallel to each other as they pass through Chambersburg, where they intersect US 30, Shippensburg, and Carlisle. Northeast of Carlisle in Middlesex Township, US 11 has interchanges with the Pennsylvania Turnpike (I-76), and then I-81 roughly  later. The stretch of US 11 between I-76 and I-81 is known as the "Miracle Mile" since it contains plenty of traveler services including restaurants, gas stations, lodging, truck stops, and shops. There is no direct interchange between the two Interstates, so travelers must use this stretch, or travel through downtown Carlisle, to get from one Interstate to the other.

US 11, now to the south of I-81, continues eastward into the western suburbs of Harrisburg as the Carlisle Pike. This road serves a major arterial route in eastern Cumberland County. Rumored to have originally been a Native American trail, it is now a significant center of urban sprawl serving much of Harrisburg's western suburbs. The road passes through Middlesex Township, the small unincorporated village of New Kingstown, Silver Spring Township, and Hampden Township. Upon reaching Pennsylvania Route 581 (PA 581), US 11 splits from Carlisle Pike and runs concurrent with PA 581.

In Camp Hill, a close suburb of Harrisburg, US 11 stops paralleling I-81 and joins US 15 northward through the western suburbs of Harrisburg, crossing I-81 in this area. As the road exits the Harrisburg area, US 11 and US 15 begin to parallel the Susquehanna River as both head northward. They intersect US 22/US 322 near Duncannon and US 522 in Selinsgrove. The two routes remain overlapped to an intersection in Shamokin Dam, where US 15 branches off to the northwest, following the path of the West Branch Susquehanna River northward. US 11, in contrast, continues to parallel the main Susquehanna River, passing through municipalities such as Danville, Bloomsburg, and Berwick (where it crosses I-80) prior to reaching the Wilkes-Barre area.

North of Wilkes-Barre in Pittston, US 11 breaks from the Susquehanna River and begins to run parallel to I-81 once more. From Wilkes-Barre, the highway goes through nearby Scranton, becoming the North Scranton Expressway north of downtown. The North Scranton Expressway (officially the Congressman Joseph M. McDade Expressway) is a freeway north of downtown Scranton that carries US 11 and PA 307 north from the Mulberry Street Bridge over the Lackawanna River near downtown north to I-81, US 6, and US 6 Business. It carried unsigned State Route 3027 (SR 3027) until SR 0011 and SR 0307 were moved off their former routes to match the signed US 11 and PA 307 alignments (forming SR 6011 and SR 6307). SR 3027 still runs along Mulberry Street from Jefferson Avenue, where US 11 and PA 307 turn southwest, southeast to Harrison Avenue (SR 6011).

In the northwest corner of Scranton (referred to as the Notch), US 11 intersects US 6. US 6 joins US 11 westward to Factoryville, where US 11 separates from US 6 and resumes its northerly trek through Susquehanna County to the New York–Pennsylvania border in Great Bend Township. This stretch was originally built from 1918 to 1922 on the old route of the Delaware, Lackawanna and Western Railroad and is called the "Lackawanna Trail". It parallels the current rail route between Scranton and Binghamton, New York, the Nicholson Cutoff, allowing views of the massive earthworks and the Tunkhannock Viaduct.

History

Prior to 1941, US 11 followed Walnut Bottom Road between Shippensburg and Carlisle while PA 33 ran along the Governor Rittner Highway. In and around Harrisburg, the highway crossed the Susquehanna River to directly service the city using the Carlisle Pike, Market Street, and the Market Street Bridge, leaving north via a concurrency with US 22 (which at the time followed Front Street out of Harrisburg). A bypass route of US 11 also existed at the time in Lemoyne, which has since been superseded by US 11 proper between Market and Front streets. In 1941, US 11 and PA 33 swapped alignments, with US 11 moving to Governor Rittner Highway and PA 33 moving to Walnut Bottom Road. Additionally, US 11 was rerouted to the west side of the river, bypassing Harrisburg entirely and replacing US 11 Bypass in Lemoyne.

Prior to 1989, US 11 followed an older alignment bypassing downtown Scranton. From Pittston Avenue, US 11 turned right onto Moosic Street and climbed the hill. At Crown Avenue, it turned left, joining PA 307 which was coming from the opposite direction on Moosic Street. Together, they crossed the Harrison Avenue bridge and continued about a mile to Myrtle Street. PA 307 and US 11 turned right on Myrtle Street for one block then left on Wheeler Avenue. After entering the borough of Dunmore and crossing the old Erie Railroad tracks, the pair turned left on Cherry Street then bore right onto South Blakely Street, entering downtown Dunmore. They turned left onto Green Ridge Street, reentering Scranton in the Green Ridge section of the city. At the end of Green Ridge Street at North Scranton Junior High School, they turned right onto Main Avenue entering the Providence section of the city. After a half mile, they turned left onto West Market Street. PA 307 left US 11 by turning left onto Keyser Avenue. US 11 continued on West Market Street to Saltry Place, where it turned left for one block then right onto the North Scranton Expressway. From it, it joined its current alignment heading toward Clarks Summit. At one time, this final intersection with the expressway was a four-way traffic circle servicing Oak Street, Market Street, the Scranton Carbondale Highway (US 6), and Northern Boulevard (today's US 11).

Major intersections

See also

References

External links

Pennsylvania Highways: US 11
Pennsylvania Roads - US 11

11
Roads in the Harrisburg, Pennsylvania area
Transportation in Franklin County, Pennsylvania
Transportation in Cumberland County, Pennsylvania
Transportation in Perry County, Pennsylvania
Transportation in Dauphin County, Pennsylvania
Transportation in Juniata County, Pennsylvania
Transportation in Snyder County, Pennsylvania
Transportation in Northumberland County, Pennsylvania
Transportation in Montour County, Pennsylvania
Transportation in Columbia County, Pennsylvania
Transportation in Luzerne County, Pennsylvania
Transportation in Lackawanna County, Pennsylvania
Transportation in Wyoming County, Pennsylvania
Transportation in Susquehanna County, Pennsylvania
 Pennsylvania